Thackthwaite is a village in Cumbria, England, from which hikers can climb Low Fell and Fellbarrow.

Villages in Cumbria
Loweswater (village)